To Love Ru is an anime series based on the manga of the same name written by Saki Hasemi and illustrated by Kentaro Yabuki. 

The second season of the anime series, titled , was produced by Xebec and directed by Atsushi Ōtsuki. It aired for 12 episodes between October 6 and December 22, 2010 and would mark the beginning of the anime strictly adhering to the manga. The opening theme for the second season is "Loop-the-Loop" by Kotoko and the ending theme is "Baby Baby Love" by Tomatsu. Sentai Filmworks have licensed the second season and released the complete series set on DVD on April 3, 2012; the Blu-ray set was released on May 27, 2014 while the series was re-released complete with an English dub on February 16, 2021.


Episode list

References

External link

 

Season 2
2010 Japanese television seasons